The 2018 Canoe Sprint European Championships was the 30th edition of the Canoe Sprint European Championships, an international sprint canoe/kayak and paracanoe event organised by the European Canoe Association, and was held in Belgrade, Serbia, between 8 and 10 June.

Canoe sprint

Medal table

Men

Women

Paracanoe

Medal table

Medal events
 Non-Paralympic classes

References

External links
Official website
Canoe sprint results
Paracanoe results

Canoe Sprint European Championships
Canoe Sprint European Championships
European Sprint Championships
June 2018 sports events in Europe
International sports competitions in Belgrade
2010s in Belgrade